Eupithecia personata is a moth in the family Geometridae. It was described by David Stephen Fletcher in 1951. It is found in Madagascar.

References

Moths described in 1951
personata
Moths of Madagascar